Romualdas Rudzys (born 9 June 1947) is a Lithuanian politician. In 1990 he was among those who signed the Act of the Re-Establishment of the State of Lithuania.

See also
Politics of Lithuania

References

External links
Biography 

1947 births
Living people
20th-century Lithuanian politicians
Place of birth missing (living people)